Oheb Sholom is a Reform synagogue located in Goldsboro, North Carolina. It is one of fewer than a hundred nineteenth-century synagogues still standing in the United States, and the second oldest synagogue building in the state.

History
The congregation was founded in February 1883 by 33 Jewish men who met "for the purpose of building a synagogue" in Goldsboro. The Goldsboro Jewish community already had a Torah and met for prayers, probably in private homes, in addition to having already formed a Cemetery Association and a Ladies' Hebrew Assistance Society. Since several families had moved to Goldsboro from Baltimore, Maryland, the congregation was patterned on the moderate Reform style of Baltimore's Temple Oheb Sholom.

Among the leading families were the Weils. Herman Weil had arrived in the United States in 1858, and was soon joined by his brothers, Henry and Solomon. They had become successful businessmen in Goldsboro by the 1870s. Solomon and Henry Weil donated the land for Herman Park, named for Herman Weil, to the City of Goldsboro on July 21, 1890. Lionel Weil, son of Solomon and Sarah Weil, donated 219 acres (89 ha) in 1945 to the State of North Carolina for a nature park, now known as Cliffs of the Neuse State Park. Gertrude Weil, daughter of Henry and Mina Weil, was a leader of the women's suffrage movement and active in a variety of progressive causes. She founded the North Carolina League of Women Voters.

The two-story, red brick synagogue was designed by Milton Harding in 1886, and is an example of Romanesque Revival architecture. It was the second Jewish house of worship in North Carolina.

References

Synagogues completed in 1886
Goldsboro, North Carolina
Religious organizations established in 1883
Reform synagogues in North Carolina
Romanesque Revival synagogues
Buildings and structures in Wayne County, North Carolina